Khirbet al-Ma'zah is a town in northwestern Syria, administratively part of the Tartus Governorate. It is located along the road between Safita in the east and Tartus to the west. According to the Syria Central Bureau of Statistics (CBS), Khirbet al-Ma'zah had a population of 4,798 in the 2004 census. It is the administrative center of the Khirbet al-Ma'zah Subdistrict (nahiyah) which consisted of 11 localities with a collective population of 22,897. Its inhabitants are predominantly Alawites.

References

Populated places in Tartus District
Towns in Syria
Alawite communities in Syria